Nelson Strait is the 9 km long and 9.8 km wide strait lying between Robert Island and Nelson Island in the South Shetland Islands, Antarctica.  The strait was explored by early 19th century sealers and first charted by Nathaniel Palmer in 1821.  While it had a variety of different names in the past (‘Harmony Strait’, ‘King George’s Strait’, ‘Parry’s Straits’, Davis's Straits’, ‘Détroit de Clothier’ etc.), the present name — probably taken from the adjacent Nelson Island — has become well established in international usage.

Location

Maps

 Chart of South Shetland including Coronation Island, &c. from the exploration of the sloop Dove in the years 1821 and 1822 by George Powell Commander of the same. Scale ca. 1:200000. London: Laurie, 1822.
 L.L. Ivanov. Antarctica: Livingston Island and Greenwich, Robert, Snow and Smith Islands. Scale 1:120000 topographic map. Troyan: Manfred Wörner Foundation, 2010.  (First edition 2009. )

See also
 Nelson Strait (Chile)

References
 Nelson Strait. SCAR Composite Antarctic Gazetteer

Straits of the South Shetland Islands
Bodies of water of Robert Island